1037 Davidweilla, provisional designation , is an asteroid from the inner regions of the asteroid belt, approximately 7 kilometers in diameter. It was discovered on 29 October 1924, by Benjamin Jekhowsky at Algiers Observatory in Algeria, Northern Africa.

Classification and orbit 

Davidweilla orbits the Sun in the inner main-belt at a distance of 1.8–2.7 AU once every 3 years and 5 months (1,237 days). Its orbit has an eccentricity of 0.19 and an inclination of 6° with respect to the ecliptic.
The body's observation arc begins with its official discovery observation at Algiers.

Physical characteristics

Diameter and albedo 

According to the survey carried out by the NEOWISE mission of NASA's Wide-field Infrared Survey Explorer, Davidweilla measures 6.884 kilometers in diameter and its surface has an albedo of 0.130.

Lightcurves 

As of 2017, no rotational lightcurve of Davidweilla has been obtained. The body's rotation period and shape remain unknown.

Naming 

This minor planet was named after David Weill, at the Sorbonne University in Paris. He was a member of the Academy of sciences. The official naming citation was published by Paul Herget in The Names of the Minor Planets.

References

External links 
 Asteroid Lightcurve Database (LCDB), query form (info )
 Dictionary of Minor Planet Names, Google books
 Asteroids and comets rotation curves, CdR – Observatoire de Genève, Raoul Behrend
 Discovery Circumstances: Numbered Minor Planets (1)-(5000) – Minor Planet Center
 
 

001037
Discoveries by Benjamin Jekhowsky
Named minor planets
19241029